Denis Trapashko (born 17 May 1990) is a Belarusian footballer playing currently for Kolos Cherven.

Honours
Torpedo-BelAZ Zhodino
Belarusian Cup winner: 2015–16

References

External links
 
 
 Profile at teams.by

1990 births
Living people
Belarusian footballers
Association football forwards
FC Energetik-BGU Minsk players
FC Smolevichi players
FC Torpedo-BelAZ Zhodino players
FC Slavia Mozyr players
FC Belshina Bobruisk players
FC Naftan Novopolotsk players
FC Dnepr Rogachev players